= Bowling at the 2010 South American Games – Men's singles =

The Men's singles event at the 2010 South American Games was held on March 24 at 9:00.

== Medalists ==
Gold	Silver	Bronze
Manuel Otalora; Colombia	Andrés Gómez; Colombia	Ildemaro Ricardo Ruiz; Venezuela

== Results ==
Rank	Athlete	Games						Total	Avg
Rank	Athlete	G1	G2	G3	G4	G5	G6	Total	Avg
1st place, gold medalist(s)	Manuel Otalora (COL)	263	258	234	228	189	202	1374	229.0
2nd place, silver medalist(s)	Andrés Gómez (COL)	194	216	246	216	245	244	1361	226.8
3rd place, bronze medalist(s)	Ildemaro Ricardo Ruiz (VEN)	212	223	268	183	201	258	1345	224.2
4	Emiel Samander (AHO)	214	245	221	223	230	206	1339	223.2
5	Sebastian Nemtala Garcia (BOL)	230	245	296	217	167	170	1325	220.8
6	Jaime González (COL)	233	188	226	250	237	185	1319	219.8
7	Ignacio Rojas Patino (BOL)	237	207	192	221	210	246	1313	218.8
8	Jonatha Ariel Hocsman (ARG)	144	246	181	259	258	217	1305	217.5
9	David Romero (COL)	259	172	210	246	213	200	1300	216.7
10	Rafael Eduardo Medina (VEN)	223	193	225	268	194	188	1291	215.2
11	Charles Robini (BRA)	200	220	209	233	171	236	1269	211.5
12	Ricardo Javier Rosa (ARG)	191	192	191	204	241	249	1268	211.3
13	Harold Andrés Pickering (CHI)	163	201	256	204	214	226	1264	210.7
14	Walter Costa (BRA)	186	196	211	226	213	210	1242	207.0
15	Adrian Reyes Vargas (CHI)	246	183	203	203	195	204	1234	205.7
16	Sebastian Montalbetti (ARG)	185	186	211	233	213	204	1232	205.3
17	Alejandro Kelly Carricarte (PAR)	172	233	191	224	212	197	1229	204.8
18	Juliano Oliveira (BRA)	179	247	180	203	204	201	1214	202.3
19	Denis Richard Toyoda (PER)	214	215	173	179	234	197	1212	202.0
20	Laurence Wilming (ARU)	185	213	225	206	181	188	1198	199.7
21	Luis Richard Olivo (VEN)	259	186	171	193	186	201	1196	199.3
22	Jorge Luis Alarcon (PAR)	225	174	232	165	196	203	1195	199.2
23	Luis Felipe Gonzalez (CHI)	203	191	174	187	202	237	1194	199.0
24	Christian Fernando Dalmasso (ARG)	190	196	205	202	217	182	1192	198.7
25	Carlos Finx (AHO)	156	171	189	211	224	233	1184	197.3
26	Danny Fung Sun (VEN)	175	187	148	235	256	160	1161	193.5
26	Pablo Hinojosa Rojas (BOL)	215	176	176	190	210	194	1161	193.5
28	[Marcio Vieira (BRA)	180	207	180	155	235	202	1159	193.2
29	Eduardo Fujinaka (PER)	161	144	210	226	190	209	1140	190.0
30	Diogenes Jose Borja (ECU)	193	198	182	167	214	164	1118	186.3
31	Tarik Samander (AHO)	188	213	177	181	203	135	1097	182.8
31	Pablo Alejandro Pohl (CHI)	185	161	237	146	135	233	1097	182.8
33	Adolfo Edgardo Chang (PER)	234	179	156	192	157	177	1095	182.5
34	Jason Odor (ARU)	210	213	157	164	175	166	1085	180.8
35	Nelson Kelly (ARU)	179	142	182	210	180	176	1069	178.2
36	Alejandro Ignacio Lopez (PAR)	160	142	222	149	211	181	1065	177.5
37	Jorge Luis Perez (ECU)	145	160	198	191	169	198	1061	176.8
38	Chieh Hsiao Tzu (PAR)	148	173	198	221	157	159	1056	176.0
39	Oscar Guillermo Candia (BOL)	199	176	162	147	180	182	1046	174.3
40	Felix Ibañez (AHO)	147	205	191	137	135	221	1036	172.7
41	Errol Brown (ARU)	165	146	183	158	193	173	1018	169.7
41	Victor Ricardo Takechi (PER)	148	158	192	158	153	209	1018	169.7
